South Carolina Highway 200 (SC 200) is a  primary state highway in the U.S. state of South Carolina. The highway travels more in a north–south direction, despite being signed as east–west. It connects the cities of Winnsboro, Great Falls, and Lancaster.

Route description

SC 200 is mostly a rural two-lane highway, traversing northwest from Winnsboro, through Great Falls and Lancaster, to the North Carolina state line.

History

Established in 1938 as a renumbering part of SC 93 to match NC 200; it originally traversed  from US 521 to the North Carolina state line.  By 1952, SC 200 was extended to its current southern terminus in Winnsboro; this replaced SC 93 from Lancaster to Great Falls and SC 22 from Great Falls to Winnsboro.

South Carolina Highway 93

South Carolina Highway 93 (SC 93) was a state highway that was established in 1925 or 1926 from SC 9 in Lancaster to the North Carolina state line north of the city, where the roadway continued as North Carolina Highway 200. In 1932, it was extended to SC 97 just northeast of Great Falls. In 1938, its northern terminus was truncated to what was US 521/SC 9 in Lancaster. Its former path was redesignated as SC 200. In 1940, its path through Lancaster was re-worked, with its former path becoming SC 93 Alternate (SC 93 Alt.). In 1952, the rest of SC 93 was decommissioned, with most of its path becoming part of SC 200.

Lancaster alternate route

South Carolina Highway 93 Alternate (SC 93 Alt.) was an alternate route that existed partially in Lancaster. It was established in February 1937 as part of a re-routing of SC 93 in Lancaster. It traveled from SC 93 and SC 914 in Crocketts Crossroads to what was US 521/SC 9 in Lancaster. In 1947, it was decommissioned and downgraded to secondary roads. Today, it is known as Springdale Road and Midway Street.

Major intersections

Winnsboro connector route

South Carolina Highway 200 Connector (SC 200 Conn.) is a  connector route that is completely within the north-central part of Winnsboro and the central part of Fairfield County. It is known as Evans Street and is an unsigned highway.

The connector route begins at an intersection with U.S. Route 321 Business (US 321 Bus.; Congress Street). The highway travels to the northwest, through a residential area of the city. It bends slightly to the west-northwest just before it reaches its northern terminus, an intersection with the SC 200 mainline. Here, the roadway continues as Evans Street Extension.

See also

References

External links

SC 200 South Carolina Highway Annex

200
Transportation in Fairfield County, South Carolina
Transportation in Chester County, South Carolina
Transportation in Lancaster County, South Carolina